"Vibeology" is the fourth single released worldwide from American singer Paula Abdul's Spellbound album.  The song was written by Peter Lord, Sandra St. Victor and V. Jeffrey Smith. It was released as the third single from the album in Australia and the United Kingdom and as the fourth single in North America. "Vibeology" was first released as a single in November 1991 in Australia, followed by a European and North American release in January 1992.

"Vibeology" peaked at number 63 in Australia in December 1991 and at number 19 in the UK in January 1992. The single reached number 16 on the US Billboard Hot 100 in February 1992, becoming Abdul's first single to peak outside the top 10 in the US since the original release of "(It's Just) The Way That You Love Me" in 1988. It also reached number 17 on the Billboard Dance Club Songs chart.

Background
Originally, Virgin Records had intended to release "Vibeology" as the third single from Spellbound following Abdul's performance of the song at the 1991 MTV Video Music Awards; however, it was delayed in favor of "Blowing Kisses in the Wind" which was receiving airplay at the time, creating demand for the song.

Track listings
 US 12-inch record
 Vibeology - Keith Cohen's House Mix (Peter Lord; Sandra St. Victor; V. Jeffrey Smith)
 Vibeology - Keith Cohen's Club Mix (Peter Lord; Sandra St. Victor; V. Jeffrey Smith)
 Vibeology - Keith Cohen's Vibe the House Dub (Peter Lord; Sandra St. Victor; V. Jeffrey Smith)
 The Promise of a New Day - 12-inch Mix (Peter Lord; V. Jeffrey Smith)
 Vibeology - Humphrey's Full-length Hip-Hop Mix (Peter Lord; Sandra St. Victor; V. Jeffrey Smith)
 Vibeology - Humphrey's House Mix (Peter Lord; Sandra St. Victor; V. Jeffrey Smith)
 Vibeology - Humphrey's Hip-House Mix (Peter Lord; Sandra St. Victor; V. Jeffrey Smith)
 Vibeology - Humphrey's Hip-Hop Instrumental (Peter Lord; Sandra St. Victor; V. Jeffrey Smith)
 Vibeology - Keith Cohen's LP Version (Peter Lord; Sandra St. Victor; V. Jeffrey Smith)

 European 7-inch single
 Vibeology - 7-inch Edit (Peter Lord; Sandra St. Victor; V. Jeffrey Smith)
 Vibeology - Hurley's House 7-inch (Peter Lord; Sandra St. Victor; V. Jeffrey Smith)

 European 12-inch record
 Vibeology - Hurley's House Mix (Peter Lord; Sandra St. Victor; V. Jeffrey Smith)
 Vibeology - Silky Sax Dub (Peter Lord; Sandra St. Victor; V. Jeffrey Smith)
 Vibeology - Hurley's Underground Mix (Peter Lord; Sandra St. Victor; V. Jeffrey Smith)
 Vibeology - Hurley's Underground Sax Dub (Peter Lord; Sandra St. Victor; V. Jeffrey Smith)
 Vibeology - Album Version (Peter Lord; Sandra St. Victor; V. Jeffrey Smith)

 UK 5-inch CD
 Vibeology - 7-inch Edit (Peter Lord; Sandra St. Victor; V. Jeffrey Smith)
 Vibeology - Hurley's House Mix (Peter Lord; Sandra St. Victor; V. Jeffrey Smith)
 Vibeology - Silky Sax Dub (Peter Lord; Sandra St. Victor; V. Jeffrey Smith)
 Vibeology - Hurley's Underground Mix (Peter Lord; Sandra St. Victor; V. Jeffrey Smith)
 Vibeology - Hurley's Underground Sax Dub (Peter Lord; Sandra St. Victor; V. Jeffrey Smith)

Charts

Release history

References

Paula Abdul songs
1991 songs
1992 singles
Songs written by Sandra St. Victor
Virgin Records singles